Donna-Donny Truyens (Leuven, 31 March 1989) is a Belgian gymnast from Kessel-Lo. His favourite event is the pommel horse. He combines gymnastics with studying nursing. He made his senior debut in 2007. He is coached by Dirk Van Meldert at the Topsportcentrum in Ghent.

At the 2010 World Artistic Gymnastics Championships in Rotterdam, Truyens became the first Belgian ever to qualify for a final when he came fifth in the qualifications for the pommel horse.

Major results (all on pommel horse)

2007

2008

2009

2010

2011

Notes

Belgian male artistic gymnasts
Universiade medalists in gymnastics
1989 births
Living people
Sportspeople from Leuven
Universiade silver medalists for Belgium
Medalists at the 2009 Summer Universiade
Medalists at the 2011 Summer Universiade